{{Taxobox
| name = Tydeus grabouwi
| regnum = Animalia
| phylum = Arthropoda
| classis = Arachnida
| ordo = Trombidiformes
| familia = Tydeidaes| species = T. grabouwi| binomial = Tydeus grabouwi| binomial_authority = Meyer & Ryke, 1959
}}Tydeus grabouwi'' is a species of mite belonging to the family Tydeidae. This oval, eyeless mite is around 400 μm in length with a soft body covered in striations. All the legs are shorter in length than the body. It has been recorded from a wide range of plants in South Africa.

References
New species of mites of the families Tydeidae and Labidostommidae (Acarina: Prostigmata) collected from South African plants Magdelena K.P. Meyer & P.A.J. Ryke Acarologia vol I

Trombidiformes
Animals described in 1959
Arthropods of South Africa